Mannamkandam  is a village near Adimali in Idukki district in the Indian state of Kerala.

Demographics
 India census, Mannamkandam had a population of 36314 with 18335 males and 17979 females.

References

Villages in Idukki district